2021 Natanz incident refers to a suspected attack on the Natanz nuclear site in Iran. The Natanz nuclear facility is placed in the wilderness in the central province of Isfahan, Iran. This site is scouted by the International Atomic Energy Agency (IAEA), the U.N. nuclear watchdog.

Location
Natanz nuclear facility is part of Iran's nuclear program. It is located near a major highway, is generally recognized as Iran's central facility for uranium enrichment. This site was made underground, some 250 km (155 miles) south of the Iranian capital Tehran, to resist enemy airstrikes.

Incident
On 10 April 2021, Iran unveiled feeding gas to several all-Iranian centrifuges, including 164 IR6 machines, 30 IR5 centrifuges, 30 IR6s centrifuges, and mechanical tests on the advanced IR9 machine on the National Nuclear Technology Day occasion. On 11 April 2021, early on Sunday, the day after the Iran unveiling, a Blackout that seemed to have been caused by a deliberately planned blast hit the Natanz nuclear facility in Iran which caused damage to the electrical distribution grid. The Natanz incident happened almost a week after Iran and Biden tried to revive the Joint Comprehensive Plan of Action, which President Trump had unilaterally withdrawn.

There were different reports of the attack including a cyber-attacked and an explosion. Iran, citing security issues, refused to reveal additional information and Israel publicly rejected to approve or deny any responsibility for the incident. the US and Israel intelligence officials claimed that Israel was behind a cyber-attacked on this incident.

Background
Natanz was first cyber-attacked by a cyber-warfare attack known as the Olympic Games that involved the use of the Stuxnet computer virus. This action caused the destruction of hundreds of centrifuges and other damage. The operation was carried by Israel and the U.S.

Aftermath
Ali Akbar Salehi, the AEOI head claimed: this incident was "sabotage" and "nuclear terrorism".

Several Israeli media said this operation was carried out by the Israeli Mossad spy service. Before, Israel had expressed dissatisfaction over Biden's revival of the nuclear deal which the United States unilaterally withdrew from the JCPOA on May 8, 2018. Iran does not recognize the existence of Israel and often refers to it as the "Zionist state."

On the morning of the accident, Lloyd Austin, the American defense secretary, met with Benjamin Netanyahu and Benny Gantz and viewed Israeli air and missile defense systems and its F-35 combat aircraft. It was not clear whether they had discussed the Natanz attack.

Damage
Kamalvandi, the Atomic Energy Organization of Iran spokesman, said: The accident caused no casualties or pollution.

Several Israeli media said: The Blackout has allotted a hard blow to Iran's uranium enrichment.

Alireza Zakani said: the damage was great and several thousand centrifuges were damaged, on the Ofoq TV channel.

According to The New York Times, two intelligence officials claimed: it had been made by the accident that destroyed the internal power system responsible for feeding underground uranium enrichment centrifuges. Israel has taken action ranging against Iran, from cyberattacks to the killings of several Iranian nuclear scientists in recent years.

Reconstruction
On November 17, 2021, the IAEA released their quarterly safeguards report regarding Verification and monitoring in the Islamic Republic of Iran in light of United Nations Security Council resolution 2231 (2015), the report concludes that the number of enriching IR-1 cascades and IR-2m cascades at the Natanz Fuel Enrichment Plant (FEP) appear to have almost fully recovered from a sabotage incident in April. Iran installed 31 cascades of IR-1 centrifuges, six cascades of IR-2m centrifuges, and two cascades of IR-4 centrifuges at the FEP. Of those, as of November 13, 28 IR-1 cascades, six IR-2m cascades, and two IR-4 cascades “were being fed” with uranium.

Reactions
Iran has blamed Israel for the Natanz accident and Mohsen Fakhrizadeh assassination in November 2020.

Hassan Rouhani, President of Iran said: in response to the attack, Iran will increase enriching uranium by up to 60% and will replace the old centrifuges with more advanced ones.

Ali Akbar Salehi, the head of Iran's Atomic Energy Organization called the incident a terrorist act and said: the Natanz accident showed the opponents of the country's industrial and political progress have failed in preventing significant development of the nuclear industry. He announced: Iran will build a new hall in all dimensions "in the heart of the mountain" near Natanz.

Mohammad Javad Zarif, the foreign minister of Iran, in a letter to Antonio Guterres, due to the high risk of potential release of radioactive material, described the Natanz sabotage as a "committed a grave war crime" and said any power that is aware of the crime, must be held accountable as an accomplice to this war crime. He also condemned two Israeli attacks on Natanz in one year.

Israeli Prime Minister Benjamin Netanyahu claimed: "the struggle against Iran and its proxies and the Iranian armament efforts is a huge mission". Already, he warned about the return of the U.S to JCPOA and said: The new deal will not be binding on Israel.

After this sabotage at Natanz that has been attributed to Israel, European Union described these actions as efforts to endangering talks to return the US to JCPOA and warned.

Aviv Kochavi, the Chief of General Staff of the Israel Defense Forces said: "operations in the Middle East are not hidden from the eyes of the enemy".

According to Reuters, diplomats said: due to security concerns following the Israeli attack on the Natanz site in April, Iran has been restricting access by U.N. nuclear inspectors to its main uranium enrichment site in Natanz.

See also

 2020 Iran explosions
 2023 Iran drone attacks
 Iran–Israel proxy conflict
 United States withdrawal from the Joint Comprehensive Plan of Action

References

Populated places in Natanz County
Cities in Isfahan Province
Nuclear program of Iran
2020 in computing
Cyberattacks on energy sector
Cyberwarfare in Iran
Explosions in 2020
Explosions in Iran
Hacking in the 2020s
Industrial computing
Iran–Israel proxy conflict
Iran–United States relations